Dorrance "Dodo" Hill Hamilton (August 16, 1928 – April 18, 2017) was an American heiress of the Campbell Soup fortune and philanthropist who founded the SVF Foundation in Newport, Rhode Island and preserved Hammersmith Farm. She was one of the wealthiest Americans according to Forbes, and a billionaire in 2005 to 2007 (at least). She had homes in Wayne, Pennsylvania, Boca Grande, Florida, Surry, Virginia and Newport, Rhode Island.

Marie Louise Dorrance Hill was born in Lenox Hill, New York, New York on August 16, 1928 to Nathaniel Peter Hill and Elinor Winifred Dorrance. She attended Foxcroft School, a boarding school for young ladies in Virginia. She married Samuel Matthews Vauclain Hamilton Sr. in 1950. She had three children, nine grandchildren and four great grandchildren. Hamilton was a granddaughter of Dr. John Thompson Dorrance, who created the process for condensing soup and purchased the Campbell Soup Company from his uncle in 1914. The family still holds a large percentage of the outstanding shares of Campbell stock. Hamilton's husband Samuel M.V. Hamilton died in 1997. In 1998 Hamilton founded the SVF Foundation.

References

1928 births
2017 deaths
American billionaires
Philanthropists from New York (state)
Campbell Soup Company people
Female billionaires
People associated with the Philadelphia Museum of Art
People from the Upper East Side
Dorrance family
20th-century American philanthropists